Richard Edwards was a fashion design company in operation from 1993 to 2002 and was based in New York City. 

It was founded by Richard Bengtsson and Edward Pavlick. 

In 1995 they won the Council of Fashion Designers of America's (CFDA) Perry Ellis award for best new menswear.

References

Clothing companies based in New York City
Menswear designers
Defunct companies based in New York City
Clothing companies established in 1993
Design companies established in 1993
Companies disestablished in 2002